The 1909–10 Colgate Raiders men's basketball team represented Colgate University during the 1909–10 college men's basketball season. The head coach was Ellery Huntington Sr. coaching the Raiders in his tenth season. The team had finished with a final record of 9–5. The team captain was Stan Greene.

Schedule

|-

References

Colgate Raiders men's basketball seasons
Colgate
Colgate
Colgate